Susana Camarero Benítez,  (Madrid, Spain, 25 April 1970) is a politician who belongs to the People's Party (PP) where she serves on the national executive.

Married, Camarero qualified in law. She entered politics in 1995 when she was elected to the Valencian regional parliament. She resigned from that body five years later when she was elected to the Spanish Congress of Deputies representing Valencia region. She was re-elected in 2004 and 2008. She has sat on various committees including defense, economy & manufacturing and public administration as well as the commission for woman's rights and equality.

References
Biography at Spanish Congress website
Biography at elmundo.es

Members of the 7th Congress of Deputies (Spain)
Members of the 8th Congress of Deputies (Spain)
Members of the 9th Congress of Deputies (Spain)
1970 births
Living people
Politicians from Madrid
People's Party (Spain) politicians
21st-century Spanish women politicians
20th-century Spanish women politicians
Members of the 4th Corts Valencianes
Members of the 5th Corts Valencianes